The Long Walk Home is a 1990 American historical drama film starring Sissy Spacek and Whoopi Goldberg, and directed by Richard Pearce.

Set in Alabama, it is based on a screenplay about the Montgomery bus boycott (1955–1956) by John Cork and a short film by the same name, produced by students at the University of Southern California in 1988.

Origins
The feature film is based on a short screenplay and film of the same name, written by John Cork, then a graduate student in directing at USC. He had submitted his script to the Cinema Department for consideration, hoping also to direct it. While USC selected Cork's script for production, the department assigned Beverlyn E. Fray, another student, to direct it.
The scenario on which the film is based, actually happened to Cork and his maid, Elizabeth Gregory Taylor, in his hometown of Montgomery, Alabama.  
The short film won several awards, including first place at the Black American Cinema Society. Cork, however, was unhappy with the finished project and unsuccessfully tried to block screenings of the short film.

Plot
The film was expanded as a feature.

Set in Montgomery, Alabama, United States, during the 1955 Montgomery bus boycott, it follows Odessa Cotter (Whoopi Goldberg), an African-American woman who works as a maid/nanny for Miriam Thompson (Sissy Spacek). Odessa and her family confront typical issues faced by African Americans in the South at the time: poverty, racism, segregation, and violence. The black community has begun a widespread boycott of the city-owned buses to end segregation; Odessa is forced to take long walks both ways to work.

Miriam Thompson offers to give her a ride two days a week to ensure she gets to work on time and to lessen the fatigue her "long walk home" is causing. Around the city, some informal carpools and other systems are starting, but most of the blacks are forced to walk to work.

As the boycott continues, tensions rise in the city. Blacks had been the majority riders on the city-owned buses, and the system is suffering financially. Miriam's decision to support Odessa by giving her a ride becomes an issue with her husband, Norman Thompson (Dwight Schultz), and other prominent members of the white community who want the boycott to end. Miriam has to choose between what she believes is right or succumb to pressure from her husband and their friends.

After an argument with her husband, Miriam decides to follow her heart. She becomes involved in a carpool group to help other black workers like Odessa. In the film's final scene, Miriam and her daughter Mary Catherine (Lexi Randall), who is the narrator of the story in flashback, join Odessa and the other protesters in standing against oppression.

Cast
 Sissy Spacek              as	 Miriam Thompson
 Whoopi Goldberg	as	 Odessa Cotter
 Dwight Schultz	        as      Norman Thompson
 Ving Rhames	        as      Herbert Cotter
 Dylan Baker	        as      Tunker Thompson
 Erika Alexander       	as	 Selma Cotter
 Lexi Randall	         as     Mary Catherine (as Lexi Faith Randall)
 Richard Parnell Habersham  as     Theodore Cotter
 Jason Weaver	         as     Franklin Cotter
 Crystal Robbins	         as     Sara Thompson
 Cherene Snow	         as     Claudia
 Chelcie Ross	         as     Martin
 Dan Butler	                  as    Charlie
 Philip Sterling      	 as     Winston
 Schuyler Fisk              as	 Judy (Girl at Oak Park)
 Mary Steenburgen           as      Narrator

Development
One of the three GM "old-look" transit buses used in this film was the Montgomery Bus Lines bus #2857, which Rosa Parks had been riding when she refused to give up her seat and was arrested. (Her arrest was the catalyst for the black community's calling the boycott.) By the time of the film, the bus was in poor condition. The filmmakers had it given a partial repaint and towed it by a cable for its scenes in the movie. It is now owned by the Henry Ford Museum in Dearborn, Michigan, where it is on permanent display.

Cinematographer John Bailey was to have made his directorial debut on this film but was replaced by Richard Pearce early into production.

Release
The film was released theatrically on December 21, 1990. In the U.S., it gained another theatrical release in March 1991 after Miramax withdrew the film from its limited December 1990 release due to the heavy competition of the 1990 holiday season.

After the film's theatrical run, it was released to videocassette by Live Home Video in the United States and in Canada that same year by Cineplex Odeon.

In 2002, the film was released twice on DVD by Platinum Disc and Artisan Entertainment, both presented in full-screen without bonus features. Both DVDs are now discontinued. On January 29, 2013, a new DVD was released by Lionsgate, under license from Miramax. It is still in full-screen and does not contain any bonus features. A widescreen DVD is available in Spain.

Reception

Critical response 
The Long Walk Home received mostly positive reviews from critics. Review aggregator Rotten Tomatoes reports that 88% of 16 professional critics gave the film a positive review, with an average score of 6.7 out of 10.

Roger Ebert gave the film three and a half out of four stars, praising the performances by Spacek and Goldberg, while criticizing some aspects of the film, like the inclusion of a white "narrator".

See also
 Civil rights movement in popular culture

References

External links 
 
 
 

1990 drama films
1990 films
Civil rights movement in film
Films scored by George Fenton
Films directed by Richard Pearce
Films set in 1955
Films set in Alabama
Films about activists
African-American drama films
Works about bus transport
1990s English-language films
1990s American films